Rachel A. Whitmer is an epidemiologist at the University of California, Davis. Whitmer is a professor in the UC Davis Department of Public Health Sciences and chief of the UC Davis Division of Epidemiology. She also works with Kaiser Permanente. Whitmer received her undergraduate degree from the University of Massachusetts Amherst, and her PhD from UC Davis.

Whitmer's research centers on the differing effects of dementia upon racial groups and age cohorts. Whitmer's findings have included a correlation between a woman's reproductive history and her chance of developing dementia. Another study led by Whitmer suggested a correlation between racism-related stress in African-American women and a higher risk of developing dementia. She is a primary investigator in the ongoing U.S. POINTER trial study Alzheimer's of led by the Alzheimer's Association.

References 

American women epidemiologists
American epidemiologists
University of California, Davis alumni
University of California faculty
Alzheimer's disease researchers
Living people
21st-century American women scientists
Year of birth missing (living people)
University of Massachusetts Amherst alumni
American women academics